The following highways are numbered 98:

International
 European route E98

China 
  G98 Expressway

India
  National Highway 98 (India)

Israel
Highway 98 (Israel)

Korea, South
Gukjido 98

New Zealand
  New Zealand State Highway 98

Poland 
  National road 98 (former; 1986–2000 and 2011–2019)

United Kingdom
 A98

United States
 Interstate 98 (proposed)
 Interstate 98 (Michigan) (former proposal)
 U.S. Route 98
 Alabama State Route 98 (pre-1957) (former)
 County Route 98 (Baldwin County, Alabama)
 Alaska Route 98 
 Arizona State Route 98
 Arkansas Highway 98
 California State Route 98
 Georgia State Route 98
 Hawaii Route 98
 Illinois Route 98
 Iowa Highway 98
 K-98 (Kansas highway)
 Kentucky Route 98
 Louisiana Highway 98
 Louisiana State Route 98 (former)
 Maine State Route 98
 Maryland Route 98 (former)
 Massachusetts Route 98
 M-98 (Michigan highway) (former)
 Minnesota State Highway 98 (former)
 Trunk Highway 98 (Minnesota 1934) (former)
 Missouri Route 98
 Nebraska Highway 98
 County Route 98 (Bergen County, New Jersey)
 New York State Route 98
 County Route 98 (Dutchess County, New York)
 County Route 98 (Monroe County, New York)
 County Route 98 (Montgomery County, New York)
 County Route 98 (Onondaga County, New York)
 County Route 98 (Orleans County, New York)
 County Route 98 (Rockland County, New York)
 County Route 98A (Rockland County, New York)
 County Route 98 (Saratoga County, New York)
 County Route 98 (Suffolk County, New York)
 North Carolina Highway 98
 Ohio State Route 98
 Oklahoma State Highway 98
 Oklahoma State Highway 98S
 Pennsylvania Route 98
 Rhode Island Route 98
South Carolina Highway 98 (pre-1937) (former)
 Tennessee State Route 98
 Texas State Highway 98
 Texas State Highway Loop 98
 Texas State Highway Spur 98 (former)
 Farm to Market Road 98
 Utah State Route 98 (former)
 Virginia State Route 98
 West Virginia Route 98
 Wisconsin Highway 98

See also
A98
N98
P98
Route 98 (MTA Maryland), a bus route in Baltimore, Maryland and its suburbs
London Buses route 98